Teyarett  is a suburb of Nouakchott and urban commune in western Mauritania. It has a population of 46,351.

References

Communes of Mauritania
Nouakchott